The Trouble with Women is a 1947 American comedy film directed by Sidney Lanfield and starring Ray Milland, Teresa Wright, Brian Donlevy. It was produced and distributed by Paramount Pictures. It was produced in 1945 but was held back from release for two years.

Synopsis
A college professor writes a controversial book claiming that woman have a secret desire to be subjugated. A female journalist sets out to try and dig up information on him by enrolling in one of his classes.

Cast 
Ray Milland as Professor Gilbert Sedley
Teresa Wright as Kate Farrell
Brian Donlevy as Joe McBride
Rose Hobart as Agnes Meeler
Charles Smith as Ulysses S. Jones
Lewis Russell as Dr. Wilmer Dawson
Iris Adrian as Rita La May
 Frank Faylen as 	Geeger
 Rhys Williams as 	Judge
 Lloyd Bridges as 	Avery Wilson
 Norma Varden as 	Mrs. Wilmer Dawson
 James Millican as 	Keefe
 Matt McHugh as 	Herman
 John Hamilton as 2nd Judge
 Charles Mayon as 	Reporter
 Minor Watson as 	Mr. Carver
 Kay Deslys as 	Bessie 
 Mary Field as Della
 Kristine Miller as 	Coquette

References

Bibliography
 McKay, James. Ray Milland: The Films, 1929-1984. McFarland, 2020.

External links 
 

1947 films
American comedy films
Paramount Pictures films
1947 comedy films
American black-and-white films
Films directed by Sidney Lanfield
Films scored by Robert Emmett Dolan
1940s English-language films
1940s American films